Pediodectes haldemanii, known generally as the Haldeman's shieldback or American shield-back katydid, is a species of shield-backed katydid in the family Tettigoniidae.

References

Further reading

External links

 

Tettigoniinae
Insects described in 1854